Bistrenci is one of the larger villages in Demir Kapija Municipality. Its population is mixed among Turks, ethnic Macedonians, Albanians, and Vlachs. It had its roots in the Ottoman period until the Slovenes came to harvest grapes. The Catholic church was then built. Many Turks stayed and still live in the village to this day. The Slovenes stayed until World War II, and the Macedonians inhabited the village afterwards and erected a Christian Orthodox community. To this day, the village is one of the few with a Mosque, which has been recently rebuilt, a Catholic church, and an Orthodox church. The Slovenian Embassy recently built a park commemorating soldiers killed in World War II. The village celebrates its patron holiday, coined Panagjur, on October 27.

Demographics
On the 1927 ethnic map of Leonhard Schulze-Jena, the village is shown as a Muslim Bulgarian village. According to the 2002 census, the village had a total of 364 inhabitants. Ethnic groups in the village include:

Macedonians 315
Turks 39
Serbs 3
Albanians 3
Others 4

See also
 Demir Kapija municipality

References

Sources 
Demir Kapija: From Prehistory to Today. , P 97-8

Villages in Demir Kapija Municipality
Macedonian Muslim villages